John Arrowsmith may refer to:

John Arrowsmith (scholar) (1602–1659), Master of Trinity College, Cambridge
John Arrowsmith (cartographer) (1780–1873), geographer and map publisher, nephew of the cartographer Aaron Arrowsmith
John C. Arrowsmith (1894–1985), general in the United States Army Corps of Engineers